HMS Ariadne was a 26 gun Walker screw frigate of the Royal Navy in service from 1859 to 1873. After decommissioning in 1873 it became a shore station from 1884 to 1905 and training hulk from 1905 to 1922.

Early career
Ariadne was a screw frigate designed by Baldwin Walker.

She served in the Channel Squadron from 1859 to 1864.

In 1860 the ship carried the future King Edward VII (then as Prince of Wales) on a royal tour of Canada and United States.

Later career and fate

In 1884 she became part of the shore establishment  and served as a naval cadet training ship. She was renamed  in 1905. As Actaeon, she was used only as a hulk by the naval torpedo school in Sheerness. She was paid off and sold for scrap in 1922. Her fate is unknown.

References

1858 ships